Steeve Farid Yago (born 16 December 1992) is a professional footballer who plays as a defender for Cypriot First Division club Aris Limassol. Born in France, he represents the Burkina Faso national team at international level. Steeve Yago featured in the 2021 AFCON tournament in Cameroon.

Career
Yago made his first Ligue 1 appearance for Toulouse on 25 August 2012, in a 0–1 win over Nancy, at age 19.

On 31 January 2019, the last day of the 2018–19 winter transfer window, Yago joined Ligue 2 side Le Havre on loan until the end of the season.

On 1 July 2021, he joined Aris Limassol in Cyprus.

Career statistics

Honours
Burkina Faso
Africa Cup of Nations bronze: 2017

References

External links

1992 births
Living people
People from Sarcelles
Footballers from Val-d'Oise
French sportspeople of Burkinabé descent
Sportspeople of Burkinabé descent
Citizens of Burkina Faso through descent
Burkinabé footballers
French footballers
Association football defenders
Burkina Faso international footballers
2015 Africa Cup of Nations players
2017 Africa Cup of Nations players
2021 Africa Cup of Nations players
Toulouse FC players
Le Havre AC players
Stade Malherbe Caen players
Aris Limassol FC players
Ligue 1 players
Cypriot First Division players
Burkinabé expatriate footballers
French expatriate sportspeople in Cyprus
French expatriate footballers
Burkinabé expatriate sportspeople in Cyprus
Expatriate footballers in Cyprus
21st-century Burkinabé people
Black French sportspeople